State Route 507 (SR 507) is a Washington state highway in Lewis, Thurston and Pierce counties that extends  from  (I-5) and  (US 12) in Centralia to  in Spanaway. They both became SR 507 during the 1964 highway renumbering.

Route description

Traveling east as Mellen, Alder and West Cherry Streets, the highway crosses railroad tracks owned by BNSF Railway and used by Amtrak's Cascades and Coast Starlight routes, both of which serve the Centralia Amtrak station. The roadway later intersects Pearl Street, the only couplet on SR 507, which parallels Tower Avenue through Downtown Centralia. The street then becomes Tower Avenue and turns north to pass the Centralia Amtrak station. SR 507 realigns west as Sixth Street to intersect and become Pearl Street, once again traveling northeast as Downing Road to leave Centralia. Within Tenino, the highway stops paralleling the BNSF tracks and goes east through the city as Sussex Avenue and starts to parallel a route of the Tacoma Rail eastward out of the city. Once in Pierce County, SR 507 intersects  in McKenna and continues north as the Spanaway McKenna Highway to Roy, where the highway turns east and then northeast into Fort Lewis. Between SR 510 in Yelm and SR 702 in McKenna, the roadway had an estimated daily average of 19,000 motorists in 2007, causing the segment to be the busiest on SR 507. The busiest segment in 1970 was the Maple Street junction in Downtown Centralia, with an estimated daily average of 14,000 motorists. SR 507 is also the southern segment of the East Pacific Highway, which runs from Centralia to Sumas.

History

Sections of modern-day SR 507 were established as wagon roads as early as 1856, with the general corridor first appearing on maps in 1897. In 1937, during the creation of the Primary and secondary highways,  (SSH 5H) was established, running from Tenino to Spanaway. A section of 507 houses the Tenino Downtown Historic District. In 1943, running from Centralia to Tenino, was created. In 1964, a highway renumbering replaced both SSH 5H and SSH 1N with SR 507.

WSDOT began construction of safety improvements to a section of SR 507 between Roy and Yelm in 1985 following a higher-than-average rate of collisions, especially those involving trees. Approximately 50 to 70 fir trees were removed to improve visibility despite opposition from local residents seeking to keep the highway's scenic qualities. The highway's bridge over the Nisqually River in McKenna was replaced by a new span in 1987. , when completed, is predicted to reduce congestion on SR 507. A section of the highway near Rainier was renamed the Sgt. Justin. D. Norton Memorial Highway in 2017 to honor a local soldier.

Major intersections

References

External links

Highways of Washington State

507
Transportation in Lewis County, Washington
Transportation in Thurston County, Washington
Transportation in Pierce County, Washington